The Belgian Women's Super League (Dutch: Super League Vrouwenvoetbal/Belgisch Vrouwenvoetbal Kampioenschap; French: Superligue/Championnat de Belgique féminin de football; German: Superliga/Belgische Frauenfußballmeisterschaft) is the highest women's football league in Belgium. It was created in 2015 after the BeNe League, a joint league for Belgium and the Netherlands, folded after the 2014–15 season.

Format
In season 2015–16, eight teams participated. They played a double round-robin in the first stage. After that, points were halved and the top four placed and bottom placed teams each played another double round-robin for a total of 20 games. The winner of the championship group qualified for the Champions League. The last placed team of the relegation group was relegated.

With only seven teams in 2016–17, the format was changed and the second stage was dropped. Teams played each other four times for a total of 24 matches per team. The tie-breakers for teams on equal points follow the men's Belgian First Division A, that is first number of wins, then goal difference.

In 2017–18, only six teams played in the league and again a championship group was played.

Teams 

Club Brugge was the only team not returning from the BeNe League for the Super League's first season, after they shut down their first team. The remaining five sides and the three highest placed teams from the first division got a place in the inaugural season, although DVL Zonhoven moved to Genk and was rebranded as Ladies Genk. In June the final line-up was published.

2015 and 2016 cup winners Lierse did not return for the 2016–17 season, leaving the league with just seven teams as none of the teams from the first division accepted the final eighth place.

Champions 

The winners of the league are crowned Belgian champions.

References

External links
Official website
League at soccerway.com
 League at UEFA

Bel
1
Sports leagues established in 2015
2015 establishments in Belgium